Simone Hye-Soon Hauswald (born Simone Hye-Soon Denkinger; 3 May 1979) is a former German biathlete and Winter Olympics bronze medalist. In 2008, she won her first single World Cup Race. Hauswald retired after the 2009–10 season.

Biography
Hauswald was born to a German father and Korean mother. As a teenager she trained at the Skiinternat Furtwangen, an alpine sports training facility in Furtwangen im Schwarzwald, and met her coach and future husband, former skier Steffen Hauswald. The couple have twin daughters.

Career highlights

IBU World Championships
2003, Khanty-Mansiysk,  3rd at team relay (with Disl / Wilhelm / Glagow)
2004, Oberhof,  3rd at team relay (with Glagow / Apel / Wilhelm)
2009, Pyeongchang,  2nd at sprint
2009, Pyeongchang,  3rd at mixed relay
IBU World Junior Championships
1998, Jericho,  1st at individual race
1998, Jericho, 8th at sprint
1999, Pokljuka,  1st at team relay (with Flatscher / Glagow)
1999, Pokljuka,  2nd at individual race
World Cup
2002, Östersund,  1st at team relay (with Apel / Disl / Wilhelm)
2002, Pokljuka,  2nd at team relay (with Glagow / Henkel / K. Beer)
2002, Osrblie,  2nd at team relay (with Glagow / K. Beer / Wilhelm)
2003, Antholz,  2nd at team relay (with Disl / R. Beer / Wilhelm)
2004, Ruhpolding,  1st at team relay (with Disl / Apel / Wilhelm)
2005, Antholz,  3rd at pursuit
2005, Khanty-Mansiysk,  3rd at sprint
2005, Hochfilzen,  3rd at team relay (with Glagow / Apel / Wilhelm)
2006, Ruhpolding,  2nd at team relay (with Glagow / Henkel / Apel)
2007, Ruhpolding,  2nd at team relay (with Hitzer / Neuner / Wilhelm)
2007, Kontiolahti,  3rd at individual race
2007, Hochfilzen,  1st at team relay (with Glagow / Henkel / Wilhelm)
2007-08, Oberhof,  1st at team relay (with Henkel / Hitzer / Wilhelm)
2008, Hochfilzen,  1st at sprint
2008, Hochfilzen,  3rd at pursuit
2008, Hochfilzen,  3rd at individual race
2009, Vancouver-Whistler  1st at individual race
2009, Trondheim,  2nd at mass start
2009, Khanty-Mansiysk,  2nd at sprint
2009, Khanty-Mansiysk  1st at mass start
World Military Championships
2004, Östersund,  2nd at team patrol (with Künzel / Apel / Wilhelm)
European Championships
2000, Zakopane,  3rd at individual race
2000, Zakopane,  3rd at team relay (with Wagenführ / Klein / Wilhelm)
2001, Haute Maurienne,  1st at team relay (with K. Beer / Flatscher / Menzel)
2001, Haute Maurienne,  2nd at sprint
2002, Kontiolahti,  1st at team relay (with Menzel / Klein / Buchholz)
European Cup
2005, Ridnaun-Val Ridanna,  1st at pursuit
2005, Ridnaun-Val Ridanna,  1st at team relay (with Niziak / Ertl / Buchholz)
2005, Ridnaun-Val Ridanna,  1st at sprint

Season titles

Race victories 
7 race victories
(3 Sprint, 2 Mass Start, 1 Individual, 1 Pursuit)

References

External links
  Official Website 
 
 

1979 births
Biathletes at the 2010 Winter Olympics
German female biathletes
German people of Korean descent
Holmenkollen Ski Festival winners
Living people
Olympic biathletes of Germany
Olympic bronze medalists for Germany
Olympic medalists in biathlon
Biathlon World Championships medalists
Medalists at the 2010 Winter Olympics
People from Rottweil
Sportspeople from Freiburg (region)